The 1986–87 daytime network television schedule for the three major English-language commercial broadcast networks in the United States covers the weekday and weekend daytime hours from September 1986 to August 1987.

Legend

 New series are highlighted in bold.

Schedule
 All times correspond to U.S. Eastern and Pacific Time scheduling (except for some live sports or events). Except where affiliates slot certain programs outside their network-dictated timeslots, subtract one hour for Central, Mountain, Alaska, and Hawaii-Aleutian times.
 Local schedules may differ, as affiliates have the option to pre-empt or delay network programs. Such scheduling may be limited to preemptions caused by local or national breaking news or weather coverage (which may force stations to tape delay certain programs to later timeslots) and any major sports events scheduled to air in a weekday timeslot (mainly during major holidays). Stations may air shows at other times at their preference.

Monday–Friday

Saturday

Sunday

By network

ABC

Returning series
ABC Weekend Special
ABC World News This Morning
ABC World News Tonight with Peter Jennings
All My Children
American Bandstand
The Bugs Bunny and Tweety Show
Ewoks (retitled The All-New Ewoks)
Fame, Fortune and Romance
General Hospital
Good Morning America
Loving
One Life to Live
Ryan's Hope
This Week with David Brinkley
Wuzzles  
New series
Bargain Hunters
The Care Bears Family
Double Talk
The Flintstone Kids
Pound Puppies
The Real Ghostbusters
Webster 
Who's the Boss? 

Canceled/Ended
The 13 Ghosts of Scooby-Doo
ABC Funfit
All-Star Blitz
Bruce Forsyth's Hot Streak
The Bugs Bunny/Looney Tunes Comedy Hour
Laff-A-Lympics 
The Littles
New Love, American Style
Pink Panther and Sons 
Scooby's Mystery Funhouse
Star Wars: Droids
The Super Powers Team: Galactic Guardians
Three's a Crowd

CBS

Returning series
The $25,000 Pyramid
As the World Turns
The Berenstain Bears
Capitol
Card Sharks
CBS Evening News
CBS Morning News
CBS News Sunday Morning
CBS Storybreak
Dungeons & Dragons 
Face the Nation
Guiding Light
Hulk Hogan's Rock 'n' Wrestling
Jim Henson's Muppet Babies
Land of the Lost 
The Price Is Right
The Puppy's Great Adventures 
Richie Rich 
The Young and the Restless

New series
The Bold and the Beautiful
Galaxy High
The Morning Program
Pee-wee's Playhouse
Teen Wolf
Wildfire

Canceled/Ended
Body Language
The Charlie Brown and Snoopy Show
Dungeons & Dragons
The Get Along Gang
In the News
Little Muppet Monsters
Pole Position 
Press Your Luck
The Wuzzles (moved to ABC)

NBC

Returning series
Disney's Adventures of the Gummi Bears
Alvin and the Chipmunks
Another World
Blockbusters
Days of Our Lives
Family Ties 
Kidd Video 
Meet the Press
NBC News at Sunrise
NBC Nightly News
It's Punky Brewster
Sale of the Century
Santa Barbara
Scrabble
Search for Tomorrow
The Smurfs
Super Password
Today
Wheel of Fortune

New series
Classic Concentration
Foofur
Kissyfur
Lazer Tag Academy
Main Street
Wordplay

Canceled/Ended
Mister T
Snorks 
Spider-Man and His Amazing Friends 
Your Number's Up

See also
1986-87 United States network television schedule (prime-time)
1986-87 United States network television schedule (late night)

Sources
https://web.archive.org/web/20071015122215/http://curtalliaume.com/abc_day.html
https://web.archive.org/web/20071015122235/http://curtalliaume.com/cbs_day.html
https://web.archive.org/web/20071012211242/http://curtalliaume.com/nbc_day.html

United States weekday network television schedules
1986 in American television
1987 in American television